Manuela Georgieva Maleeva (born 14 February 1967) is a Bulgarian former professional tennis player. She played on the WTA Tour between 1982 and 1994. Through her marriage, Maleeva began representing Switzerland officially from January 1990 until her retirement in February 1994.

One of the most consistent players on tour in the 1980s and early 1990s, Maleeva reached her career-high singles ranking of No. 3 in the world in February 1985 and finished with a year-end top 10 ranking for nine consecutive years (1984 till 1992). A winner of 19 WTA singles titles and four doubles titles, she also reached a total of 14 Grand Slam quarterfinals in her career, including two US Open semifinals in 1992 and 1993, which are her career-best Grand Slam results. She was a semifinalist at the 1987 Virginia Slims Championships.

Maleeva was the bronze medalist in singles at the 1988 Seoul Olympics, winning Bulgaria's first (and thus far, only) Olympic tennis medal. In 1992, she paired up with Jakob Hlasek at the Hopman Cup where they took home Switzerland's first ever title at the event.

Career
Maleeva was born in Sofia, the oldest of the three children of Georgi Maleev and Yuliya Berberyan. Her mother, who came from an Armenian family, was the best Bulgarian tennis player in the 1960s. After she retired from professional tennis in the 1970s, Berberyan started a coaching career. She coached all three of her daughters, Manuela, Katerina, and Magdalena, each of whom became a top six player.

In 1982, Maleeva won the junior French Open, and also made her debut on the senior tour, ending the year ranked in the top 100. After ending the 1983 season in the top 40, she won five tournaments in 1984, and made her debut in the top 10 after defeating Chris Evert in the final of the Italian Open. She also won her only Grand Slam title that year – in mixed doubles at the US Open with American Tom Gullikson.

In 1988, Maleeva-Fragnière, won a bronze medal in singles at the Seoul Olympics in Seoul. In 1992 and 1993, Maleeva-Fragnière registered her all-time best achievement in Grand Slam singles competition when she reached the semifinals of the US Open both years (in 1992, after beating youngest sister Magdalena in the quarterfinals).

In 1994, Maleeva-Fragnière retired from professional tennis, after winning the title in Osaka where she beat Iva Majoli in the final. During her 12-year career, she won 19 WTA singles titles, four doubles titles, and one mixed doubles title. She also teamed with Jakob Hlasek to help Switzerland win the Hopman Cup in 1992.

In Fed Cup competition, Maleeva twice helped Bulgaria reach the semifinals (1985 and 1987), and then led Switzerland to the quarterfinals in 1991.

Personal life

Maleeva married Swiss tennis coach François Fragnière in December 1987 and from then on, began competing as Manuela Maleeva-Fragnière. She represented Switzerland from 1990 until her retirement. They have three children, Lora, born in 1995, Iva in 1997, Timo in 1999, but divorced in 2003. She currently resides in La Tour-de-Peilz, about 90 km northeast of Geneva across Lake Geneva.

Retirement life

Maleeva has been active in politics back in her home country, being one of the founding members of Yes, Bulgaria! which was founded in 2017. The party focuses on institutional reforms and an anti-corruption agenda. Prior to that, she also advocated the 2015 Bulgarian electoral code referendum.

Outside politics, Maleeva is also active in her foundation, Fondation Swissclinical, which she co-founded in 2008. The foundation focuses on helping handicapped children and children in need by providing them with good medical care and long-term support.

Major finals

Grand Slam tournament finals

Mixed Doubles: 1 (1 title)

Olympics

Singles: 1 bronze medal

Maleeva-Fragnière lost in the semifinals to Gabriela Sabatini 1–6, 2–6. In 1988, there was no bronze medal play-off match; both beaten semifinal players received bronze medals.

Performance timelines

Singles

Doubles

WTA career finals

Singles: 37 (19 titles, 18 runner-ups)

Doubles: 11 (4 titles, 7 runner–ups)

ITF Circuit finals

Singles: 4 (2 titles, 2 runner–ups)

Doubles: 3 (3 titles)

Junior Grand Slam tournament finals

Singles: 1 (1 title)

Fed Cup
Manuela Maleeva debuted for the Bulgaria Fed Cup team in 1983. She has a 21–5 singles record and a 7–10 doubles record (28–15 overall).

Singles (21–5)

Doubles (7–10)

Record against other top players
Maleeva's win–loss record against certain players who have been ranked world No. 10 or higher is as follows:

Players who have been ranked world No. 1 are in boldface.

 Katerina Maleeva 8–1
 Catarina Lindqvist 7–2
 Kathy Jordan 6–0
 Kathy Rinaldi 6–1
 Lori McNeil 6–2
 Claudia Kohde-Kilsch 5–2
/ Helena Suková 5–2
 Conchita Martínez 5–4
 Sylvia Hanika 4–0
/ Natasha Zvereva 4–0
 Jo Durie 4–1
 Brenda Schultz-McCarthy 4–1
 Zina Garrison 4–2
 Nathalie Tauziat 4–6
/ Karina Habšudová 3–0
 Mima Jaušovec 3–0
 Lisa Bonder 3–1
 Barbara Potter 3–2
 Andrea Temesvári 3–2
 Bonnie Gadusek 3–4
/ Hana Mandlíková 3–4
/ Martina Navratilova 3–11
 Magdalena Maleeva 2–0
 Dominique Monami 2–0
 Virginia Ruzici 2–0
 Carling Bassett-Seguso 2–1
 Kathleen Horvath 2–1
 Dianne Fromholtz 2–2
 Bettina Bunge 2–3
 Mary Joe Fernández 2–5
 Gabriela Sabatini 2–7
 Pam Shriver 2–7
 Chris Evert 2–17
 Sue Barker 1–0
 Kimiko Date-Krumm 1–0
 Julie Halard-Decugis 1–0
 Iva Majoli 1–0
 Mary Pierce 1–0
 Stephanie Rehe 1–0
 Barbara Paulus 1–1
/ Jana Novotná 1–2
 Wendy Turnbull 1–2
 Arantxa Sánchez Vicario 1–5
 Tracy Austin 0–1
 Jennifer Capriati 0–1
 Evonne Goolagong Cawley 0–1
 Anke Huber 0–2
// Monica Seles 0–9
 Steffi Graf 0–17

See also
 Katerina Maleeva
 Magdalena Maleeva
 List of female tennis players

References

External links
 
 
 

1967 births
Bulgarian female tennis players
Bulgarian people of Armenian descent
French Open champions
French Open junior champions
Hopman Cup competitors
Living people
Naturalised citizens of Switzerland
Olympic medalists in tennis
Olympic tennis players of Switzerland
Olympic tennis players of Bulgaria
Olympic bronze medalists for Bulgaria
People from Riviera-Pays-d'Enhaut District
Sportspeople from Sofia
Swiss female tennis players
Swiss people of Armenian descent
Bulgarian emigrants to Switzerland
Tennis players at the 1988 Summer Olympics
Tennis players at the 1992 Summer Olympics
US Open (tennis) champions
Grand Slam (tennis) champions in mixed doubles
Grand Slam (tennis) champions in girls' singles
Medalists at the 1988 Summer Olympics
Manuela